Garson is a designated place within the Rural Municipality of Brokenhead in the Canadian province of Manitoba. Originally named Lyall, it held village status from 1915 to 2003. It now forms part of the Local Urban District of Tyndall-Garson.

History 
Garson originally incorporated as the Village of Lyall on January 1, 1915. Its official name was changed to Garson on April 9, 1927. It dissolved from village status on January 1, 2003 to become part of the Rural Municipality of Brokenhead.

Demographics 

Government 
Garson is governed by the Rural Municipality of Brokenhead. As part of the Local Urban District of Tyndall-Garson, it is further governed by a committee of three elected officials that have a mandate to render decisions on maintenance of public infrastructure and enforcement of bylaws.

See also 
List of communities in Manitoba
List of designated places in Manitoba

References 

Designated places in Manitoba
Former villages in Manitoba